Werauhia nephrolepis is a plant species in the genus Werauhia. This species is native to Costa Rica.

References

nephrolepis
Flora of Costa Rica